The MV Demetrios II, also known as Dimitrios II, was a cargo ship, built in 1964 by J. J. Sietas at their shipbuilding yard in Hamburg-Neuenfelde, Germany. The ship ran aground off the coast of the Mediterranean island of Cyprus in 1998.

Paphos accident 
The Honduran-flagged M/V Demetrios II ran aground off Paphos Lighthouse on 23 March 1998 in heavy seas, during a voyage from Greece to Syria with a cargo of timber.

At the time of the accident, the ship had eight crew members: 4 Greeks, 2 Pakistanis and 2 Syrians. The crew were rescued and airlifted to safety of Paphos by a British military helicopter.

It was subsequently confirmed in the Lloyd's List that the seafaring certificates of competency for the Greek captain and the Pakistani first officer had been forged.

The wreck can clearly be seen whilst traveling along the center of Paphos to Coral Bay Road.

References

Maritime incidents in 1998
Shipwrecks in the Mediterranean Sea
1964 ships